The town of Ramah  is a Statutory Town in El Paso County, Colorado, United States. The population was 123 as of the 2010 census. According to tradition, the name is derived from India.

History

The area was first settled in a place called Old Zounds, which was 27 miles southeast of Kiowa. The post office, called O.Z. because the applicant just used the initials, existed until at least 1881. The post office was moved from Old Zounds to nearby Ramah in 1889.

Ramah began as a small railroading town along the Rock Island Railroad in the late 1800s. It was incorporated on July 18, 1927. During its peak, it was home to several hundred residents. Eventually, by the mid-1900s, the railroad was shut down, and Ramah suffered, since the railroad connected it to Colorado Springs, forty miles to the southwest. Despite its decline, Ramah continues to exist, with ranching as the mainstay of its economy.

Geography
Ramah is located at  (39.121838, -104.165824).

Demographics

As of the census of 2000, there were 117 people, 50 households, and 31 families residing in the town. The racial makeup of the town was 86.32% White, 0.85% African American, 0.85% Pacific Islander, 1.71% from other races, and 10.26% from two or more races. Hispanic or Latino of any race were 8.55% of the population.

There were 50 households, out of which 26.0% had children under the age of 18 living with them, 46.0% were married couples living together, 12.0% had a female householder with no husband present, and 38.0% were non-families. 28.0% of all households were made up of individuals, and 10.0% had someone living alone who was 65 years of age or older. The average household size was 2.34 and the average family size was 2.94.

In the town, the population was spread out, with 27.4% under the age of 18, 3.4% from 18 to 24, 20.5% from 25 to 44, 36.8% from 45 to 64, and 12.0% who were 65 years of age or older. The median age was 44 years. For every 100 females, there were 91.8 males. For every 100 females age 18 and over, there were 107.3 males.

The median income for a household in the town was $29,250, and the median income for a family was $48,000. Males had a median income of $29,167 versus $21,667 for females. The per capita income for the town was $15,465. There were no families and 2.4% of the population living below the poverty line, including no under eighteens and none of those over 64.

See also

Outline of Colorado
Index of Colorado-related articles
State of Colorado
Colorado cities and towns
Colorado municipalities
Colorado counties
El Paso County, Colorado
List of statistical areas in Colorado
Front Range Urban Corridor
South Central Colorado Urban Area
Colorado Springs, CO Metropolitan Statistical Area

References

External links
Town of Ramah contacts
CDOT map of the Town of Ramah

Towns in El Paso County, Colorado
Towns in Colorado